Malysha Kelly (born 14 January 1990) is a Jamaican netball player, who has made over 50 appearances for the national side, and is a former captain. At club level, she most recently played for Severn Stars in the Netball Superleague.

Club career
Kelly plays as a goal defence and a goalkeeper. She has played for St Catherine Racers in the Jamaican Berger Elite League, and signed for English club Manchester Thunder ahead of the 2016 Netball Superleague season. Ahead of the 2017 Suncorp Super Netball season, Kelly signed for Australian team Adelaide Thunderbirds. She had the most intercepts of any player in the season.

She signed for New Zealand team Southern Steel ahead of the 2018 ANZ Premiership season. In early 2018, Kelly suffered an anterior cruciate ligament injury, which forced her to miss the 2018 ANZ Premiership season, the 2018 Commonwealth Games, and the September 2018 Quad Series. She re-ruptured the ACL later in 2018, which prolonged her time away from professional netball.

Kelly signed for English team Severn Stars for the 2021 Netball Superleague season. She left the team ahead of the 2022 season.

International career
Kelly has made at least 62 international appearances for Jamaica. She made her senior debut in the 2008 Americas Federation of Netball Associations Championships in Saint Vincent and the Grenadines. In 2009, she was part of the Jamaica under-21 team that came third at the Netball World Youth Cup. In the same year, she played in Jamaica's tour of Australia and New Zealand. She played in 2010 World Netball Series, where Jamaica came third. Kelly represented Jamaica at the 2011 World Netball Championships, where they finished fourth. She represented Jamaica in the netball event at the 2014 Commonwealth Games, where Jamaica won the bronze medal. In the same year, she captained Jamaica during their tour of England. Kelly missed the 2015 Netball World Cup in Australia due to a knee injury, that she sustained during the Berger Elite League. In 2017, she played at the Caribbean Netball Championships. Her last appearance for Jamaica prior to her 2018 injury was in the 2017 Fast5 Netball World Series tournament.

In December 2020, Kelly was included in the Jamaica squad for their tour of England. It was her first callup since her ACL injury, though the series was later postponed due to Jamaican travel restrictions caused by the COVID-19 pandemic. She was in the Jamaican squad for their 2021 series against Trinidad and Tobago, and the 2021 Vitality Roses Reunited Series in England. Kelly was not selected for the 2022 Commonwealth Games, but returned to the Jamaican squad for their 2023 tour of England.

Personal life
Kelly studied at the University of the West Indies.

References

Living people
1990 births
Jamaican netball players
Netball players at the 2014 Commonwealth Games
Commonwealth Games bronze medallists for Jamaica
Southern Steel players
Manchester Thunder players
Severn Stars players
Adelaide Thunderbirds players
ANZ Championship players
Suncorp Super Netball players
Netball Superleague players
Jamaican expatriate netball people in Australia
Jamaican expatriate netball people in England
Jamaican expatriate netball people in New Zealand
University of the West Indies alumni